5:01 is the second studio album by Canadian country music artist Tim Hicks. It was released on August 5, 2014 via RGK Entertainment Group/Open Road Recordings. The album features appearances by Blackjack Billy, Clayton Bellamy and Madeline Merlo.

A special edition of the album, 5:01+, was released on September 4, 2015, including the single "Young, Alive and In Love".

Track listing

Chart performance

Album

Singles

References

External links 

2014 albums
Tim Hicks albums
Open Road Recordings albums